Jens Hovmøller Klemmensen (February 23, 1902 – February 17, 1977) was a Danish architect. In 1932 he won a silver medal in the art competitions at the Los Angeles Games for his design of a "Stadium and Public Park".

References

 
  
  
 

1902 births
1977 deaths
20th-century Danish architects
Olympic silver medalists in art competitions
Medalists at the 1932 Summer Olympics
Olympic competitors in art competitions